Lithariapteryx abroniaeella is a species of sun moth in the family Heliodinidae.

The MONA or Hodges number for Lithariapteryx abroniaeella is 2510.

References

Further reading

External links

 

Heliodinidae
Moths described in 1876